Ravilovo (Rawil) is a rural locality (village) in Ravilovsky Selsoviet, Abzelilovsky District, Bashkortostan, Russia. The population was 494 as of 2010. There are 7 streets.

Geography 
Ravilovo is located 17 km south of Askarovo (the district's administrative centre) by road. Ishkulovo is the nearest rural locality.

References 

Rural localities in Abzelilovsky District